Kaanal Neer is a 2007 Indian Tamil-language drama film written and directed by Chinni Jayanth. The film stars J. K. Rithesh, Chinni Jayanth and Manisha Chatterjee. It was released on 12 April 2007.

Cast
J. K. Rithesh as Rajvel
Chinni Jayanth as Pari
Manisha Chatterjee as Lakshmi
Sarjit as Shakthi
Ambuli as Durai Singam
Alex
Sathyapriya
Devan
Ponnambalam
Scissor Manohar
Suja in an item number

Production
The film's lead actor J. K. Rithesh produced the film, and spent significantly on the marketing of the film.

Reception
The film was released on 12 April 2007. A critic from ChennaiOnline wrote "it's not a hyped film or one that boasts of big names, but it has its light moments, and it's a much better crafted film than the director's earlier effort, Unakkaga Mattum (2000)". A review from IndiaGlitz.com noted "though it is a beaten-to-bush story, Chinni Jayanth, with lesser known artistes around, has tried his best to come up with an engrosser". A reviewer from IndiaReel noted "trying to present a serious movie on friendship, Chinni and new face Ritheesh have succeeded in giving a hip-roaring comedy film and tested the patience of audience in each and every scene".

The film did not perform well at the box office.

References

External links

2007 films
2007 drama films
Indian drama films
2000s Tamil-language films